National Highway 561A, commonly referred to as NH 561A is a national highway in  India. It is a spur road of National Highway 61. NH-561A traverses the states of Karnataka and Maharashtra in India.

Route 

Ahmednagar,Mirajgaon,Karmala, Jeur, Tembhurni, Karkamb, Pandharpur, Mangalwedha, Umadi, Balgaon Bijapur.

Junctions  

  Terminal near Ahmednagar.
 National Highway 65 (India) near Tembhurni
  Terminal near Bijapur.

See also 

 List of National Highways in India
 List of National Highways in India by state

References

External links 

 NH 561A on OpenStreetMap

National highways in India
National Highways in Maharashtra
National Highways in Karnataka